Heuchin is a commune in the Pas-de-Calais department in the Hauts-de-France region of France.

Geography

Population

Places of interest

 The church of St.Martin, dating from the twelfth century.
 Traces of an old castle and sandstone wells.

See also
Communes of the Pas-de-Calais department

References

External links

 Commune website

Communes of Pas-de-Calais